Bertie is a surname. Notable people with the surname include:

 Earl of Lindsey and Duke of Ancaster and Kesteven, titles in the Peerage of England, including a list of titleholders, all of whom bear the surname Bertie
 Albemarle Bertie (disambiguation)
 Andrew Bertie (1929–2008), 78th Prince and Grand Master of the Sovereign Military Order of Malta
 Charles Bertie (disambiguation)
 Diego Bertie (born 1967), Peruvian actor and singer
 Francis Bertie, 1st Viscount Bertie of Thame (1844-1919), British diplomat
 Henry Bertie (of Weston-on-the-Green) (died 1734), Member of Parliament for Oxford, Westbury, and Woodstock
 Henry Bertie (proprietor) (c. 1675–1735), Lord Proprietor of North Carolina and Member of Parliament for Beaumaris
 John Bertie (born 1923), United States Navy officer during World War II
 Montagu Bertie (disambiguation)
 Peregrine Bertie (disambiguation)
 Philip Bertie (c. 1660–1728), English courtier and politician
 Priscilla Bertie, 21st Baroness Willoughby de Eresby (1761–1828)
 Richard Bertie (courtier) (died 1582), English landowner and religious evangelical
 Robert Bertie (disambiguation)
 Thomas Bertie (1758–1825), Royal Navy admiral
 Willoughby Bertie, 3rd Earl of Abingdon (1692–1760)
 Willoughby Bertie, 4th Earl of Abingdon (1740–1799)